Haji Aroeppala Airport , sometimes abbreviated H. Aroeppala Airport, is an airport in Selayar Regency, South Sulawesi, Sulawesi Island, Indonesia.

Airlines and destinations

The following destinations are served from H. Aroeppala Airport:

References

Airports in South Sulawesi